Sookaera is a village in Kiili Parish, Harju County in northern Estonia.

References

Villages in Harju County